ONIC Esports (abbreviated as ONIC) is a Southeast Asia esports team founded in Indonesia by Rob Clinton Kardinal in 2018. They manage competitive esports division teams in Mobile Legends: Bang Bang, PUBG Mobile, Valorant and Free Fire.

Mobile Legends: Bang Bang

History 
ONIC Esports was established on July 28 2018, At first the team had only esports division in Mobile Legends: Bang Bang which participate at MPL Indonesia Season 2.

Season 10 
On July 4 2022, ONIC Esports announced the acquisition of player Kairi "Kairi" Rayosdelsol and coach Denver "Yeb" Miranda from their Philippine franchise team ONIC Philippines. Became the first Filipino player import in the Mobile Legends: Bang Bang.

ONIC Esports had a good kick-off after the 2-0 match against the Indonesian MLBB team Rebellion Zion with the first match of their import Kairi "Kairi" Rayosdelsol on his  first match that leads to a 4/0/11 KDA. On the second game, they secured the lord on the 10-minute mark focusing only on the destroying the base which leads to victory against the enemy team.

Current Rooster

Free Fire 
History

ONIC Olympus is a Indonesian esports team that competes under the division of Free Fire.

References 

Esports teams based in Indonesia